Pyrochlore is a mineral group of the niobium end member of the pyrochlore supergroup. 
The general formula,  (where A and B are metals), represent a family of phases isostructural to the mineral pyrochlore.
Pyrochlores are an important class of materials in diverse technological applications such as luminescence, ionic conductivity, nuclear waste immobilization, high temperature thermal barrier coatings, automobile exhaust gas control, catalysts, solid oxide fuel cell, ionic/electrical conductors etc.

Occurrence
The mineral is associated with the metasomatic end stages of magmatic intrusions. Pyrochlore crystals are usually well formed (euhedral), occurring usually as octahedra of a yellowish or brownish color and resinous luster. It is commonly metamict due to radiation damage from included radioactive elements.

Pyrochlore occurs in pegmatites associated with nepheline syenites and other alkalic rocks. It is also found in granite pegmatites and greisens. It is characteristically found in carbonatites. Associated minerals include zircon, aegirine, apatite, perovskite and columbite.

Name and discovery
It was first described in 1826 for an occurrence in Stavern (Fredriksvärn), Larvik, Vestfold, Norway.

Crystal structure
Pyrochlore is  also a more generic term for the pyrochlore crystal structure (Fdm). The more general crystal structure describes materials of the type A2B2O6 and A2B2O7 where the A and B species are generally rare-earth or transition metal species; e.g. Y2Ti2O7.The pyrochlore structure is a super structure derivative of the simple fluorite structure (AO2 = A4O8), where the A and B cations are ordered along the  direction. The additional anion vacancy resides in the tetrahedral interstice between adjacent B-site cations. These systems are particularly susceptible to geometrical frustration and novel magnetic effects.

The pyrochlore structure shows varied physical properties spanning electronic insulators (e.g. La2Zr2O7), ionic conductors (Gd1.9Ca0.1Ti2O6.9), metallic conductors (Bi2Ru2O7−y), mixed ionic and electronic conductors, spin ice systems (Dy2Ti2O7), spin glass systems (Y2Mo2O7), haldane chain systems (Tl2Ru2O7) and superconducting materials (Cd2Re2O7). More disordered structures, such as the bismuth pyrochlores, have also been investigated due to interesting high-frequency dielectric properties.

Niobium mining
The three largest producers of niobium ore are mining pyrochlore deposits. The largest deposit in Brazil is the CBMM mine located south of Araxá, Minas Gerais, followed by the deposit of the Catalão mine east of Catalão, Goiás. The third largest deposit of niobium ore is Niobec mine west of Saint-Honoré near Chicoutimi, Quebec.

Pyrochlore ore typically contains greater than 0.05% of naturally occurring radioactive uranium and thorium.

Lueshe in North Kivu, Democratic Republic of Congo, has substantial deposits of pyrochlore.

See also

 List of minerals

References

Sodium minerals
Calcium minerals
Niobium minerals
Oxide minerals
Cubic minerals
Minerals in space group 227
Minerals described in 1826